Trinidad de la Noi Gutierrez (born April 24, 1998) is a Chilean model and actress and winner of the contest Elite Model Look Chile 2012.

Life 
Born in Santiago de Chile, she is the daughter of Alberto de la Noi and Carmen Gutierrez, and has a twin brother, Lucas.

At twelve years old, Trinidad was discovered by a modeling agent of Felipe Ramirez when she was in a mall. As she was very young, she was signed by the agency Elite Model but had to wait until the age of fourteen to enter.

Elite Model Look Chile
In August 2012, she won the Elite agency contest to find the best model in Chile, and that same year participated in the World Elite contest that was held in Shanghai, China, and was 1st runner-up.

She was signed for several campaigns for major sports firms including Adidas and the magazine Women's Health. While still a teenager and still studying, Trinidad travelled to Europe during her vacations to work, at fifteen she did her first show at the Milan Fashion Week, where she paraded for signature Dolce & Gabbana, and her first international campaign, to the prestigious La Perla.

Trinidad has modeled for the following international companies: Tommy Hilfiger, Armani, Vogue Italia, La Perla and Dolce & Gabbana. She has also made appearances in magazines like Women's health and Elle.

Filmography 

  (2014)
 See also: Maldito amor#Steffi, Trini & Kel cover

References

External links
Trinidad de la Noi at Elite Model Management Chile

1998 births
Chilean female models
Chilean people of French descent
Living people
21st-century Chilean women